The Extraordinary and Plenipotentiary Ambassador of Peru to Romania is the official representative of the Republic of Peru to Romania.

As of 2023, the Ambassador to Romania is also accredited to Croatia, Moldova, Montenegro and North Macedonia, having also been accredited to Serbia until December 29, 2018, when the Ambassador to Hungary became accredited instead.

Both countries established relations on October 10, 1939. Peru severed its relations as a result of World War II, but reestablished them at en embassy level with the Socialist Republic of Romania on November 9, 1968, after the 1968 Peruvian coup d'état and the establishment of Juan Velasco Alvarado's Revolutionary Government. Under Velasco Alvarado's tenure, Peru pursued closer relations with Romania and the rest of the Soviet bloc.

Peru has an embassy in Bucharest. It closed in 1991, but reopened on August 4, 1994. The ambassador to Romania was accredited to Serbia until 2018.

List of representatives

See also
List of ambassadors of Peru to the Soviet Union
List of ambassadors of Peru to Czechoslovakia
List of ambassadors of Peru to East Germany
List of ambassadors of Peru to Yugoslavia
List of ambassadors of Peru to Bulgaria
List of ambassadors of Peru to Albania
List of ambassadors of Peru to Hungary
List of ambassadors of Peru to Poland

References

Romania
Peru